Daniel Sánchez Llibre (born 22 December 1950 in Vilassar de Mar, Catalonia, Spain) is a Catalan businessman and the former President of Spanish football club RCD Espanyol.

References

1950 births
Living people
People from Vilassar de Mar
Businesspeople from Catalonia
RCD Espanyol